John Mason (March 30, 1927January 20, 2019) was an American artist who did experimental work with ceramics. Mason's work focused on exploring the physical properties of clay and its "extreme plasticity". One of a group of artists who had studied under the pioneering ceramicist Peter Voulkos, he created wall reliefs and expressionistic sculptures, often on a monumental scale.

Biography 
Mason spent his early childhood in the Midwest; his family moved to Fallon, Nevada in 1937, where he finished elementary and high school. He settled in Los Angeles in 1949 at the age of 22. He attended Otis Art Institute, and in 1954 enrolled at Chouinard Art Institute, where he became a student and close friend of ceramicist Peter Voulkos. The two rented a studio space together in 1957, which they shared until Voulkos moved to Berkeley, California in the fall of 1958.

Mason's early Vertical Sculptures from the early 1960s were associated with contemporary trends in Abstract Expressionism and also with the aesthetics of primitivism. Writer Richard Marshall commented that in their "rawness, spontaneity and expressiveness, [the pieces] give the impression of having been formed by natural forces. The formal and technical aspects of balance, proportion, and stability – although purposefully planned and controlled – are subsumed by the very presence of the material itself".

Mason taught sculpture at Pomona College.

Mason later equipped his studio to prepare, manipulate, and fire monumental sculptures in clay, many of which had to be fired in pieces weighing over a ton in kilns that had already been adapted to serve his large-scale purposes, before being assembled on the wall. According to writer and curator Barbara Haskell, who wrote the introduction to the catalog for Mason's 1974 retrospective at the Pasadena Museum of Art, "These pieces have a monumentality and physical size that had no precedent in contemporary ceramics".

A subsequent series represents a more conceptual approach to Mason's interest in mathematics, one that is concerned less with the physical properties of clay as a medium and more with what those properties allow one to represent. As Richard Marshall wrote:

The Firebrick Sculptures, begun in the early 1970s, reveal a shift in Mason's work away from an involvement with materials and technique toward an involvement with the conceptualization and systematization of a piece that is removed from its actual realization. While maintaining an association with the ceramic tradition – firebricks are made of ceramic material and are used for the construction of kilns – their neutral color and standardized form make it possible to conceive of and execute large-scale geometric configurations of stacked bricks, such as Hudson River Series VIII (1978), in a variety of mathematically plotted arrangements.

References

Further reading

2000
Los Angeles County Museum of Art. Color and Fire: Designing Moments in Studio Ceramics, 1950-2000. Text by: Jo Lauria, Gretchen Adkins, Garth Clark, Rebecca Niederlander, Susan Peterson, Peter Selz. Los Angeles: Los Angeles County Museum of Art, 2000.
Los Angeles County Museum of Art. Made in California: Art, Image, and Identity, 1900-2000. Essays by Stephanie Barron, Sheri Bernstein, Michael Dear, Howard N. Fox, Richard Rodriguez. Los Angeles: Los Angeles County Museum of Art.
Pagel, David. "A Lively Trip Through Ceramic History", Los Angeles Times, "Calendar" section, June 18, 2000, pp. 52–53, illustrated.
Knight, Christopher. "A Visible Crack in Fragile Art," Los Angeles Times, "Calendar" section, July 23, 2000.
Johnson, Ken. "John Mason and Peter Voulkos," New York Times Art Review, November 3, 2000, p. B-36.
Muchnic, Suzanne. "John Mason," American Craft, vol. 61, no. 2., April – May 2000, illustrated.
Peterson, Susan. Contemporary Ceramics. Laurence King Publisher, 2000.
1999
Belloli, Jay et al. Radical Past: Contemporary Art and Music in Pasadena, California. Essays by: Jay Belloli, Suzanne Muchnic, Peter Plagens, Jeff Vander Schnidt. Pasadena: Norton Simon Museum of Art, 1999.
Arizona State University. The Anne and Sam Davis Museum (catalog). Tempe: Arizona State University Art Museum, Tempe, AZ, 1999.
1998
Metropolitan Museum of Art. Clay Into Art: Selections from the Contemporary Ceramics Collection. New York: Metropolitan Museum of Art, 1998.
1997
Muchnic, Suzanne. "John Mason," ARTnews, vol. 96, no.4, April 1997, pp. 137–138.
Frank, Peter. "Art Picks of the Week," LA Weekly, March 7–13, 1997. p. 132 (illustrated).
1990
Lynn, Martha Drexler. Clay Today. Los Angeles: Los Angeles County Museum of Art.
Marks, Ben. "John Mason's Conceptual Journey", American Craft, vol. 50, no. 6, December 1990/ January 1991, pp. 36–41.
1987
White, Cheryl. "Exhibitions: A Contained Geometry," ArtWeek, May 2, 1987, illustrated.
Perry, Barbara and Ron Kuchta. American Ceramics Now. Syracuse: Everson Museum of Art, 1987.
1986
Benezra, Neal. "But Is It Art? The Always Tenuous Relationship of Craft to Art", New York Times, Arts and Leisure section, October 19, 1986, pp. 1, 34 (illustrated)
Kelley, Jeff. "John Mason," ArtForum, vol. 24, no. 10, Summer 1986, pp. 132, 133 (illustrated).
1982
Perreault, John. "Fear of Clay", ArtForum, vol. 20, April 1982. pp. 22–25
Davis, Doug. "Brave Feats of Clay", Newsweek, vol. 99, January 11, 1982.
1981
Schjeldahl, Peter. "California Goes to Pot," The Village Voice, December 23–29, 1981.
Kramer, Hilton. "Ceramic Sculpture and the Taste of California," New York Times, December 20, 1981.
Marshall, Richard and Suzanne Foley. Ceramic Sculpture: Six Artists. New York: Whitney Museum of Art, 1981.
1979
Clark, Garth. A Century of Ceramics in the United States, New York: E.P. Dutton, 1979 (illustrated)
1978
Minneapolis College of Art and Design. 4 Artists, 16 Projects. Minneapolis: Minneapolis College of Art and Design, 1978.
Krauss, Rosalind. "John Mason and Post-Modernist Sculpture: New Experiences, New Worlds", Art in America, vol. 67, no. 3, May–June, 1978, pp. 120–127 (illustrated)
McDonald, Robert. "John Mason: Structure and Space," Art Week, vol. 9, no. 29, September 9, 1978, pp. 1,20 (illustrated)
Conn, Catherine and Rosalind Krauss. John Mason: Installations from the Hudson River Series. Yonkers: Hudson River Museum, 1978.
1977
Levin, Elaine. "Foundations of Clay," ArtWeek, vol. 8, no. 21, May 21, 1977, p. 3 (illustrated)
1976
Belloli, Jay and Barbara Haskell. American Artists: A New Decade. Fort Worth: The Fort Worth Art Museum, 1976.
Hopkins, Henry. Painting and Sculpture in California: The Modern Era. San Francisco: San Francisco Museum of Modern Art, 1976.
Turnbull, Betty. The Last Time I Saw Ferus, 1957-1966. Newport Beach: Newport Harbor Art Museum, 1976.
Whitney Museum of American Art, 200 Years of American Sculpture, New York: Whitney Museum of American Art, 1976.
1974
Neuberg, George. Public Sculpture/ Urban Environment. Oakland: The Oakland Museum, 1974.
Canavier, Elena Karina. "John Mason Retrospective", ArtWeek, June 1, 1974.
Wilson, William. "Mason Monoliths Leave Their Mark," 'Los Angeles Times, May 20, 1974.
O'Doherty, Brian. "The Grand Rapids Challenge," Art in America, vol. 62, no. 1, January–February 1974, pp. 78–79.
Plagens, Peter. Sunshine Muse. Praeger Publishers, 1974.
Haskell, Barbara et alia. John Mason Ceramic Sculpture. Pasadena: Pasadena Museum of Art, 1974.
1969
Ashton, Dore. Modern American Sculpture. Harry Abrams, 1969.
Coplans, John. West Coast 1945-1969. Pasadena: Pasadena Museum of Art, 1969.
1967
Tuchman, Maurice. American Sculptors of the Sixties. Los Angeles: Los Angeles County Museum of Art, 1967.
Wechsler, Judith. "Los Angeles – John Mason," Artforum, vol. V, no. 6, February 1967, pp. 64–65 (illustrated)
Langsner, Jules. "Los Angeles," Art News, vol. 65, no. 9, January 1967, p. 26
Coplans, John. John Mason Sculpture. Los Angeles: Los Angeles County Museum of Art, 1967.
Coplans, John. "Abstract Expressionist Ceramics", Artforum, vol. V, no. 3, November 1966.
1964
Art Institute of Chicago, 67th American Exhibition. Chicago: Art Institute of Chicago, 1964.
1963
Langsner, Jules. "America's Second Art City," Art in America, vol. 51, no. 2, April 1963.
Coplans, John. "Sculpture in California," Artforum, vol. 2, no. 2, August 1963, pp. 4,33 (illustrated).
Coplans, John and Philip Leider. "West Coast Art: Three Images," Artforum, vol. 1, no. 12, June 1963, pp. 23, 25
1962
Culler, George and Lloyd Goodrich. Fifty California Artists. New York: Whitney Museum of American Art, 1962.
1961
Slivka, Rose. "The New Ceramic Presence," Craft Horizons, vol. 21 no. 4, July/August 1961. pp. 30–37 (illustrated)

1927 births
2019 deaths
20th-century American sculptors
Artists from Nebraska
Otis College of Art and Design alumni
People from Perkins County, Nebraska
Pomona College faculty
21st-century American sculptors